Survivor: Thailand is the fifth season of the American CBS competitive reality television series Survivor. The season was filmed from June 10, 2002, through July 18, 2002, on the island of Ko Tarutao in Thailand, and premiered on September 19, 2002. Hosted by Jeff Probst, it had 16 participants tasked with surviving in the wild for 39 days.

At the live finale, Brian Heidik was named Sole Survivor, defeating runner-up Clay Jordan by a jury vote of 4–3. The season introduced several new gameplay twists. The first occurred on Day 1, when the two eldest contestants, Jake Billingsley and Jan Gentry, were given the power to pick their own tribes. This was the first time in Survivor history that the two initial teams were not preselected by the producers. The second was an offer of mutiny on Day 14: each of the twelve remaining contestants was given the chance to leave their tribe and join the other if they wished, though no one took the offer. The third was the fake merge: with ten players remaining, the two tribes moved onto one beach. They took this to signify a merge, but at the next challenge they were informed that they were living on one beach, but not yet merged.

Contestants 
The two initial tribes were Chuay Gahn (Thai:  "to help one another") and Sook Jai ( "happy heart"). They eventually merged into the Chuay Jai tribe when eight contestants remained, thus becoming the first merged tribe of Survivor history to have combined words of two existing tribes.

Future appearances
Shii Ann Huang competed on Survivor: All-Stars.

Season summary 
The sixteen contestants were split into two tribes of eight by the two eldest contestants, Jake and Jan; this was the first time in series history that the tribes were not preselected. Jake's tribe, Sook Jai, was composed of younger players and took an early lead. Chuay Gahn, despite losing five of the first seven challenges, remained mostly cohesive barring a conflict between Ghandia and Ted, whom Ghandia claimed made unwanted sexual advances toward her. This led to Ghandia being voted off in the next Tribal Council. Chuay Gahn won the next two immunity challenges, evening the playing field at five members per tribe.

On Day 19, the tribes were instructed to live on the same beach. Assuming a merge had occurred, Shii Ann from Sook Jai decided to switch allegiances to the Chuay Gahn alliance under the presumption that she was being ostracized by her tribe. However, the players were shocked to learn that they had not yet merged and were only living on the same beach; Shii Ann was subsequently voted off after Sook Jai lost the immunity challenge. Sook Jai was never able to recover from their numerical deficit, and they were systematically picked off one by one once the merge finally happened on Day 25.

With only Chuay Gahn members left, they were forced to turn on each other. Brian, who had made separate alliances with three of the four other people used his influence to manipulate the vote to his liking. First, he turned the tribe on Ted, who was perceived as the biggest physical threat. Then, he targeted Helen and successfully convinced Clay and Jan to follow suit. After winning the final immunity challenge, Brian decided to take Clay with him to the finals, eliminating Jan.

Both Brian and Clay were met with heavy criticism from the jury. Brian, who had made separate alliances and formed friendships with both Helen and Ted, was lambasted for his callous approach, but he was praised for his challenge performances and strong work ethic. In comparison, Clay was felt as not deserving for his lack of work ethic, and he was accused of making racial slurs against Ted. In the end, the jury voted 4-3 for Brian to win, awarding him for his control of the game.

In the case of multiple tribes or castaways who win reward or immunity, they are listed in order of finish, or alphabetically where it was a team effort; where one castaway won and invited others, the invitees are in brackets.

Episodes

Voting history

Note

Reception
Survivor: Thailand was met with a mostly negative reception and is generally considered one of the weakest seasons in the show's history. The primary criticisms were aimed at the unlikable cast and the fake merge twist, which led to the demise of Sook Jai. In 2005, Probst stated that he was not fond of the season, going as far as calling it his least favorite to date. He described the season as "mean-spirited and marred with hostility and ugliness" and called Helen, Jan, Clay, and Brian "the least likable final four ever." Dalton Ross, the Survivor columnist of Entertainment Weekly, ranked it as the fourth-worst season of the series, only better than Survivor: Fiji, Survivor: Nicaragua, and Survivor: Island of the Idols. Andrea Reiher of Zap2it ranked Thailand as the second-worst season of the series, only ahead of Survivor: Redemption Island, while Joe Reid of The Wire ranked it as the 6th-worst season. 

In 2015, both Rob Cesternino and a poll by Rob Has a Podcast ranked this season as the third-worst season of all time. This was updated in 2021 during Cesternino's podcast, Survivor All-Time Top 40 Rankings, ranking 38th. In 2020, Survivor fan site "The Purple Rock Podcast" ranked Thailand as the 3rd-worst season of the series, only ahead of Survivor: Nicaragua and Survivor: Island of the Idols, describing the cast as "a definite contender for least likable cast of all time." Later that same year, Inside Survivor ranked this season 34th out of 40 citing the lack of people to root for and calling it a "bleak" season.

References

External links
 Official CBS Survivor Thailand Website

05
2002 American television seasons
2002 in Thailand
Satun province
Television shows set in Thailand
Television shows filmed in Thailand